Association Olympique Ben Gardane or AOB, is a Tunisian football club, based in the city of Ben Gardane in southeast Tunisia. Founded on 2012, the team plays in green and white colors. Their ground is Stade du 7 Mars, which has a capacity of 10,000.

He managed to reach for the first time in its history in Tunisian Ligue 4 during the season 2022–2023. The club is chaired by Ltaief Helal.

Honours and achievements

Players

First-team squad

Club Officials

Board of directors

Current technical staff

References

Football clubs in Tunisia
Association football clubs established in 2012
2012 establishments in Tunisia
Sports clubs in Tunisia
Ben Gardane